Stockton is a village in Jo Daviess County, Illinois, United States. The population was 1,862 at the 2010 census, down from 1,926 at the 2000 census.

History
The village of Stockton is the youngest village in Jo Daviess County. It was established after the Minnesota Northwestern Railroad decided to build a station in Section 2 of Stockton Township in 1886, which through mergers later became named the Chicago Great Western Railway. The railroad tracks were removed in the early 1970s.

What is now Front Street in Stockton was then a dirt road which served as the main thoroughfare to Lena. In April 1887, one Charles Hermann became Stockton's first business owner.

In 1914, the Kraft Brothers opened a cheese factory in Stockton, and operated it until Kraft sold the facility in 1998. This was the birthplace of the Kraft Corporation and the first cheese plant opened by J.L. Kraft.

Geography
Stockton is located at  (42.350357, -90.006127).

Climate

Major highways
  U.S. Route 20, east towards Freeport and west towards Galena.
  Illinois Route 78, north towards Warren and the Wisconsin state line and south towards Mount Carroll.

Demographics

As of the census of 2000, there were 1,926 people, 831 households, and 521 families residing in the village. The racial makeup of the village was 99.69% White, 0.05% Native American, 0.05% Asian, and 0.21% from two or more races. Hispanic or Latino of any race were 0.42% of the population.

There were 831 households, out of which 28.3% had children under the age of 18 living with them, 51.5% were married couples living together, 7.8% had a female householder with no husband present, and 37.2% were non-families. 33.0% of all households were made up of individuals, and 17.6% had someone living alone who was 65 years of age or older. The average household size was 2.24 and the average family size was 2.83.

In the village, the population was spread out, with 23.1% under the age of 18, 6.5% from 18 to 24, 26.9% from 25 to 44, 21.0% from 45 to 64, and 22.5% who were 65 years of age or older. The median age was 41 years. For every 100 females, there were 89.4 males.  For every 100 females age 18 and over, there were 84.0 males.

The median income for a household in the village was $35,921, and the median income for a family was $43,173. Males had a median income of $28,594 versus $23,026 for females. The per capita income for the village was $17,728. About 4.5% of families and 8.2% of the population were below the poverty line, including 8.2% of those under age 18 and 11.7% of those age 65 or over.

Geology
Stockton is not part of the Driftless Area, but is the first municipality found outside of it, coming from western Jo Daviess County. One climbs out of the valley of the Upper Mississippi River and finds a high point in Stockton.

The village water tower sits on a ridge at elevation 1,105 ft (337 m) that rises to 1,120 ft (341 m) to the west at the village limits. To the northwest the same ridge line continues where U.S. Route 20 crests at 1,077 ft (337 m) just to the west. This ridge line continues for 3 miles to the northwest to Benton Mound (1,204 ft, 367 m), the second highest peak in Illinois.

Notable people 

 Leo Binz, archbishop of Dubuque and St. Paul and Minneapolis, was born in Stockton.
 Ron Lawfer, farmer and Illinois legislator, was born in Stockton.
 Dennis Gage, host of the television show My Classic Car, grew up in Stockton.

Historical landmarks
Townsend Home
W.E. White Building

References

External links
Jo Daviess County

Villages in Jo Daviess County, Illinois
Villages in Illinois
Driftless Area
Populated places established in 1886